Blackwulf (Lucian) is a fictional character appearing in American comic books published by Marvel Comics.

Fictional character biography

Blackwulf (Lucian) is the fourth son born to Lord Tantalus and Queen Nirvana on Armechadon. Though all of Lord Tantalus’ children had been born considered genetically perfect, Lucian bore a birthmark which was considered his affliction of the Black Legacy. On evening that Lord Tantalus was to venture to Earth, Queen Nirvana killed herself to prevent herself from giving birth to anymore monstrous children. Having very low respect for Lucian and his abilities, Tantalus decided to bring Lucian with him to Earth, wherein the Celestials decided to exile Lord Tantalus. Tantalus created an underground lair he called Lyonesse where he and his sons Lucian and Pelops lived.

Sent on a mission alongside Schizo and Bristle, Lucian was to escort Pandara back to Lyonesse, but while on their way, they had to fight through the rebel leader Blackwulf (Pelops), Thunderstrike, Stellaris, and Code: Blue. When the Code: BLUE assembled against them, Lucian was convinced by Schizo and Bristle to retreat, which meant abandoning Pandara.

Becoming obsessed with training, Lucian sparred with his brother Pelops, and lost to him time and again which came as no great surprise to Lord Tantalus. Tantalus then decided to send Lucian to lead the Peacekeepers in retrieving Dr. Caitlin Maddox, a genetic researcher who had the ability to stabilize Deviant genetic code. This mission was interrupted by the arrival of the Underground Legion, and Lucian fought their leader Blackwulf. In the course of this battle, Lucian began to suspect that he was battling his own brother, Pelops. In the end, the Underground Legion escaped with Dr. Maddox.

After Lucian returned to Lyonesse, Pelops exposed himself to Lucian as Blackwulf. He taunted Lucian and dared him to kill him, yet Lucian could not bring himself to do so. Unknown to them both, Lord Tantalus had overheard their entire conversation and killed Pelops himself, hopeful that this would show Lucian not to go against him. Instead, Lucian made a vow to destroy his father, and adopted the identity of Blackwulf for himself.

Blackwulf attempted to inform the Peacekeepers of what had happened to Pelops, but they rejected his accusations against Tantalus. Lucian then went looking for the Underground Legion, and offered to become their latest member. Though they did not trust Lucian immediately, he would prove himself worthy to them as they fought the Peacekeepers over the bodies of two dead Skrulls at Wright-Patterson AFB. The battle ended with the Peacekeepers escaping with one of the Skrulls, while the Underground Legion was forced to flee from arriving soldiers. Taking to the air in a stealth fighter, they were shot down by the villain Scorch.

Wildwind (one of the members of the Underground Legion) was seemingly killed in the crash. Blackwulf battled Scorch in the wreckage of the fighter and was able to match his power, but he and the Underground Legion were forced to surrender when reinforcements arrived for Scorch. They were taken and imprisoned at the base.

Blackwulf was set free by Dr. Maddox and the Prime Skrull, and while the others departed, he went back to retrieve Wildwind's body. Scorch was waiting for him, and the two fought over her body, with Blackwulf ultimately winning the battle. To his surprise, the rest of the Underground Legion waited for him to return, and they set back to their base.

Blackwulf joined the Underground Legion and Giant-Man in following Sparrow to Ottsville, Pennsylvania, where she had gone missing while on assignment. They found that the people of Ottsville had been taken over by living circuitry created by Ultron, and that Sparrow herself was under his control. Mammoth (Underground Legion member) broke Ultron's control over Sparrow by telling her that Lucian had killed Pelops, and how he was now the new Blackwulf. Sparrow attacked Blackwulf, but was brought to her senses. The Underground Legion and Giant-Man were unable to capture Ultron, but Blackwulf defeated Sentry#459, and Giant-Man mended some of Ultron's damage by making the people of Ottsville believe that they had been restored to full humanity.

Blackwulf returned to the mansion with the Underground Legion, and Sparrow started another fight with him, still holding him responsible for Pelops' death. Blackwulf had an opportunity to kill her with his Black Legacy, and she welcomed it. Blackwulf then decided to stand down, revolted by her lack of emotion. He told her how Pelops' last words had been that he loved her—but Lucian didn't think she deserved such love. He then left the Underground Legion.

Blackwulf set off into the streets of New York, coming into contact with humanity for the first time. When a vendor offered him a hot dog, he accepted it, not understanding the use of money. A woman also had a proposition for him, and he was shocked that humans even charged money for what she was proposing. When a man's car was stolen, Blackwulf tried to help by hurling his Shadowlance at it, but he destroyed the car in the process, upsetting the owner. At that moment, the Celestial’s Godstalker appeared, thinking that Blackwulf was his father Tantalus. Godstalker did not believe that Tantalus could ever produce offspring. Blackwulf fought back against it, declaring his innocence, but the Godstalker had him far outmatched, and broke his Shadowlance in two. He was saved by the arrival of Sparrow, who used both halves of the Shadowlance to defeat the Godstalker. Blackwulf awoke in Sparrow's apartment, but he quickly realized that the Godstalker could not have been destroyed, even as it had started an assault on the building.

Blackwulf fought the Godstalker side-by-side with Sparrow, but the Godstalker teleported the two of them into another dimension to battle him there. Sparrow was able to access the dimension Blackwulf was in with the aid of Khult, and brought him his Shadowlance, rebuilt and made into a fourth-dimensional weapon by Khult. By channeling positive energy, Blackwulf was able to slice the Godstalker into ribbons, but even then it still existed. However, the Godstalker now believed Lucian's claim of being Tantalus' son, and declared that it would be his duty to destroy Tantalus. After which, the Godstalker bonded to the Shadowlance, making it even more powerful. As a result of this bonding process, Blackwulf was cured of his Black Legacy, which removed his birthmark. 
Lucian learned from S.H.I.E.L.D. databases held by the Underground Legion that Deathlok, (from an alternate reality), came from a world in which Pelops was still alive, and Tantalus had converted to the side of good. Lucian was determined to find Deathlok and learn more about his reality.

Just as Lucian caught up with Deathlok in a series of tunnels where he was aiding homeless people against the Sewer King alongside Daredevil, Lucian decided to wait with his questions to assist the homeless from bombs planted to harm them by Walter Jenkins. Lucian saved Deathlok from being slain by one of the bombs. When he was finally able to ask Deathlok questions, Lucian was told by Deathlok (Manning) that nothing he could tell Lucian would change a thing in his world, because their fates had already been sealed. Lucian asked Deathlok to join the Underground Legion, but Deathlok replied that he had to sort himself out first before he could be of use to anyone.

Apparently brought to Armechadon by Khult, Blackwulf joined the Underground Legion in battling Lord Tantalus and his Peacekeepers, and found himself reunited with his mother, Nirvana. Wishing to end her suffering, no matter the sacrifice to himself, Blackwulf absorbed the Black Legacy which surrounded her into himself, regaining his birthmark but setting her free. Blackwulf then attacked his Lord Tantalus, and recalling instructions from Khult, focused on positive energies. Blackwulf absorbed his father's Black Legacy into himself, with the result of temporarily displacing his father's ego. Lucian was also transformed so that now his skin was completely black.

Powers and abilities
Lucian also possesses enhanced strength and durability. As a result of his heritage, Lucian is afflicted with Black Legacy, a form of energy which can instantly destroy anything living upon contact. Lucian bears a birthmark of a stripe along the left side of his face, which is a representation of the Black Legacy within him. When using his powers this stripe covers the entire left half of his face.

The Shadowlance, which lets Lucian channel the Black Legacy bound by his anger and rage into energy blasts.

References

External links 
 

1994 comics debuts
Comics characters introduced in 1994
Fictional characters with superhuman durability or invulnerability
Marvel Comics characters with superhuman strength
Marvel Comics mutates
Marvel Comics superheroes
Marvel Comics titles
Superhero comics